The following is a list of Teen Choice Award winners and nominees for Choice Summer Music Star: Group. It was first introduced in 2012. 5 Seconds of Summer receives the most wins with 3.

Winners and nominees

References

Summer Music Star Group
Music Star Group